Ruteh (also Romanized as Rūteh, Roteh, and Rūdeh) is a village in Rudbar-e Qasran Rural District, Rudbar-e Qasran District, Shemiranat County, Tehran Province, Iran. At the 2006 census, its population was 508, in 153 families.

References 

Populated places in Shemiranat County